Mithat Sancar (born 1963) is a Turkish professor of public and constitutional law, columnist, and translator of Arab descent. He has been an MP for the Peoples' Democratic Party (HDP) in the Turkish parliament since the June 2015 general election and was elected Co-Chair of the party in February 2020.

Biography

Early life and academic career 
Born 1963 in Nusaybin, Sancar attended high school in Diyarbakır before going to Ankara University, where he graduated majoring in public law. In 1995, following his graduation, he received his Ph.D. in constitutional law with a thesis on the "Interpretation of Basic Rights".

From 1985-1990, he was employed as a research assistant in the Faculty of Law of the Dicle University. Since 1999, he has been a lecturer and since 2007 a full professor at Ankara University. Together with fellow scholar , he translated Jürgen Habermas' first major work "Strukturwandel der Öffentlichkeit" into the Turkish language.

Political activism 
Between 1998 and 2003, Sancar and his colleague Tanıl Bora organized the Human Rights Association's (İHD) annual conference on the Human rights movement in Turkey.

Since 2007, he has been a columnist for the leftist BirGün newspaper. He also wrote for the newspapers Taraf.

Parliamentary career 
Ahead of the June 2015 general election, Sancar was asked by HDP leader Selahattin Demirtaş, one of his former students, to run for parliament. After some hesitation, he agreed to suspend his academic career in order to help the HDP over the 10% threshold. Heading the party's electoral list in the Mardin constituency, he was elected a member of the Grand National Assembly. In the subsequent November 2015 snap election and in the General Election 2018 he was reelected. He is currently a Deputy Speaker of the Grand National Assembly.

In November 2015, Sancar and Erol Dora joined fellow MPs Gülser Yıldırım and Ali Atalan in their hunger strike to protest the ongoing state of exception curfew in the border town of Nusaybin, where since November 13 and under the pretext of operating against militant YDG-H members, 70% of the neighborhoods have been cut from electricity, 30% from water supply.

On 23 February 2020, Sancar was elected Co-Chair of the Peoples' Democratic Party along with Pervin Buldan who was re-elected.

Legal prosecution 
According to an interview he gave Sancar was accused of having insulted the President for having declared the Turkish government was in part responsible for the terrorist attack against a HDP rally in Ankara and for having also said to the authorities that a conflict should be prevented in Cizre. Then he is also prosecuted for Propaganda for the PKK because he has supported the opening of Kurdish schools. The State Prosecutor at the Court of Cassation in Turkey Bekir Şahin filed a lawsuit before the Constitutional Court on the 17 March 2021, demanding for Sancar and 686 other HDP politicians a five-year ban for political activities. The lawsuit was filed jointly with a request for the HDP to be shut down due to the parties alleged organizational links with the PKK.

Personal life 
Sancar is married to Türkan Sancar and the cousin of the Nobel prize in Chemistry laureate in 2015, Aziz Sancar. Sancar considers Arabic his native language, while Kurdish was the language he spoke on the street. Besides these, he speaks Turkish, English and German.

Books 

 Devlet Aklı” Kıskacında Hukuk Devleti (2000)
 Mülteciler veİltica Hakkı (2002, co-authored by Bülent Peker)
 Geçmişle Hesaplaşma - Unutma Kültüründen Hatırlama Kültürüne (2007)

References

External links 
 

1963 births
Living people
People from Nusaybin
Turkish people of Arab descent
Turkish legal scholars
Ankara University Faculty of Law alumni
Academic staff of Ankara University
Peoples' Democratic Party (Turkey) politicians
Members of the 25th Parliament of Turkey
Members of the 26th Parliament of Turkey
Deputies of Mardin
Members of the 27th Parliament of Turkey
Deputy Speakers of the Grand National Assembly of Turkey